The 1953 Grand National was the 107th renewal of the Grand National horse race that took place at Aintree Racecourse near Liverpool, England, on 28 March 1953.

The race was won by eight-year-old Early Mist at odds of 20/1. Early Mist was the first of trainer Vincent O'Brien's three consecutive Grand National victories, and his jockey, Bryan Marshall, would also go on to win a second successive National the following year on Royal Tan.

Of the 31 that started, 5 finished. Mont Tremblant was 2nd, Irish Lizard was 3rd, Overshadow finished 4th and Senlac Hill was last to complete in 5th.

Finishing order

Non-finishers

References

 1953
Grand National
Grand National
Grand National
20th century in Lancashire